Bob "Mr. Mac" McQuillen (June 27, 1923 – February 4, 2014) was a teacher, musician, and prolific composer of contra dance tunes. He was a recipient of a 2002 National Heritage Fellowship awarded by the National Endowment for the Arts, which is the United States government's highest honor in the folk and traditional arts.

Early life
McQuillen was born near Boston, but his family moved to southwestern New Hampshire when he was young. Although his father and grandfather were musicians, and Bob took piano lessons as a child, he didn't grow attached to music until after his time as a Marine during World War II. He started going to contra dances in and around Peterborough, New Hampshire, several times a week, and eventually joined the Ralph Page Orchestra. At a contra dance in 1946, he met Priscilla Scribner, whom he married a year later. They had three children, Dan, Rebecca, and William.

After returning from the Korean War, McQuillen settled down and became an industrial arts teacher at Peterborough High School and ConVal High School, where the students referred to him as "Mr. Mac". At some point, he was a police officer and a school bus driver.

Contra dance years
McQuillen was involved in the contra dance community for over 60 years. Over his lifetime, he wrote more than 1,300 dance tunes, most of which he named after people or events in his life. This tradition began with his first tune, "Scotty O'Neil", named after one of his students who had died.

McQuillen was the subject of a 2001 documentary film titled Paid to Eat Ice Cream: Bob McQuillen and New England Contra Dancing. Perhaps his most famous tune is "Amelia's Waltz".

Death 
McQuillen suffered a stroke while at a restaurant on Sunday, January 26, 2014. He was taken to Catholic Medical Center in Manchester, New Hampshire, where he died on Tuesday, February 4, exactly 29 years after his wife.

Discography

See also
Benjamin Marshall House, McQuillen's Dublin home

References

External links
 He keeps contra dance moving
 YouTube: 2004 Interview with Bob McQuillen (by the NH State Council on the Arts)
 YouTube: Interview at the Ralph Page Legacy Dance Weekend 2011
 YouTube: Bob's 90th Birthday Party
 2023 Centenary Project to play all Bob McQuillen's published tunes

1923 births
2014 deaths
Folk musicians from Massachusetts
People from Peterborough, New Hampshire
American male composers
Contra dance
National Heritage Fellowship winners
United States Marine Corps personnel of World War II